Palm Bay may refer to:

 Palm Bay, Florida, a city in Florida, United States
 Palm Bay (Florida), a bay in Florida, United States
 Palm Bay, Kent, a bay in Cliftonville, England 
 Palm Bay (alcoholic beverage), a Canadian line of vodka cooler beverages; see Alcopop